KYCN (1340 AM) is a radio station broadcasting a country music format. Licensed to Wheatland, Wyoming, United States. The station is currently owned by Smith Broadcasting, Incorporated and features programming from CBS News Radio and Westwood One.

References

External links

YCN
Country radio stations in the United States